Charles Belden (1887–1966) was an American photographer and rancher.

Charles Belden may also refer to:

Charles F. D. Belden (1870–1931), American librarian, president of the American Library Association
 Charles William Belden, birth name of Bunny Belden (1900–1976), American football player
Charles S. Belden (1904–1954), Hollywood screenwriter